The 1997 WAFU Club Championship was the 19th  football club tournament season that took place for the runners-up or third place of each West African country's domestic league, the West African Club Championship. It was won by Ghana's Ghapoha Readers after defeating Niger's JS Ténéré in the second leg. More than last season and fewer than in 1995, seven clubs took part.

First round

|}

Ghapoha Readers directly headed to the quarterfinals

Quarterfinals

|}

Semifinals

|}

Finals

|}

Winners

See also
1997 CAF Champions League
1997 CAF Cup Winners' Cup
1997 CAF Cup

References

External links
Full results of the 1997 WAFU Club Championship at RSSSF

West African Club Championship
1997 in African football